, also spelled Teke-Teke, Teketeke, or Teke teke, is a Japanese urban legend about the ghost of a schoolgirl who is said to have fallen onto a railway line, where her body was cut in half by a train. She is an onryō, or a vengeful spirit, who lurks in urban areas and around train stations at night. Since she no longer has a lower body, she travels on either her hands or elbows, dragging her upper torso and making a scratching or "teke teke"-like sound. If she encounters an individual, she will chase them and slice them in half at the torso, killing them in such a way that mimics her own disfigurement.

Overview
Common elements of the legend include that Teke Teke is the vengeful ghost or spirit (also known as an onryō) of a young woman or schoolgirl who fell on a railway line in Northern Japan, which resulted in her being sliced in half by a train. Missing her lower extremities, she is said to walk on her hands or her elbows, making a scratching or "teke teke"-like sound as she moves. If an individual encounters Teke Teke at night, she will chase them and cut their body in half (often with a scythe), mimicking her own death and disfigurement.

One version of the story concerns a young woman known as Kashima Reiko. As with the original iteration of the legend, Kashima died when her legs were severed from her body by a train after she fell on the tracks. According to some sources, some versions of the legend state that, when an individual learns of Kashima's story, she will appear to them within one month. The "Kashima Reiko" story predates that of Teke Teke. The legless spirit of Kashima Reiko is said to haunt bathroom stalls, asking occupants if they know where her legs are. If a questioned individual replies with an answer that Kashima does not find acceptable, she will rip or cut their legs off. Individuals may survive the encounter by replying that her legs are on the Meishin Expressway, or by responding with the phrase "kamen shinin ma", or "mask death demon" (which may be the phonetic root of Kashima's name). The legend of Kashima Reiko has been described as a "bathroom-centric variation" of Teke Teke.

See also
 Aka Manto ("Red Cape"), a Japanese urban legend about a spirit that appears in bathrooms.
 Hanako-san, a Japanese urban legend about the spirit of a young girl who haunts school bathrooms.
 Kuchisake-onna ("Slit Mouth Woman"), a Japanese urban legend about a disfigured woman.
 Madam Koi Koi, an African urban legend of a ghost who haunts schools.
 Sadako Yamamura, a ghost from the Ring novels and films.
 Teketeke (film), a 2009 film based on the urban legend.
 TEKE::TEKE, a Canadian rock group.

References

Further reading

Female legendary creatures
Japanese bathroom ghosts
Japanese folklore
Japanese urban legends